Stepnoy is a rural locality (a khutor) in Sovetskoye Rural Settlement, Kalachyovsky District, Volgograd Oblast, Russia. The population was 387 as of 2010. There are 7 streets.

Geography 
Stepnoy is located 40 km southeast of Kalach-na-Donu (the district's administrative centre) by road. Volgodonskoy is the nearest rural locality.

References 

Rural localities in Kalachyovsky District